Česká Kubice is a municipality and village in Domažlice District in the Plzeň Region of the Czech Republic. It has about 900 inhabitants.

Administrative parts
Villages of Dolní Folmava, Horní Folmava, Nová Kubice, Nový Spálenec, Spáleneček and Starý Spálenec are administrative parts of Česká Kubice.

Geography
The eastern part of the municipal territory lies in the Cham-Furth Depression, the western part lies in the Upper Palatinate Forest and borders Germany.

Gallery

References

Villages in Domažlice District